National Route 493 is a national highway of Japan. The highway connects Kochi, Kochi and Tōyō, Kochi.

References

493
Roads in Kōchi Prefecture